Lake Querococha (possibly from Quechua qiru ceremonial drinking vessel, or q'iru wood and qucha lake; "qiru lake" or "wood lake") is a lake in Peru located in the Ancash Region, Recuay Province, in the districts Ticapampa and Catac. Lake Querococha lies on the western side of the Cordillera Blanca, southwest of Yanamarey and Pucaraju, northwest of Mururaju and Queshque and east of Recuay.

See also
 Queshquecocha
List of lakes in Peru

References

Lakes of Peru
Lakes of Ancash Region